Esmeral Özçelik Tunçluer (born 7 April 1980) is a Dutch-Turkish former basketball player for Fenerbahçe İstanbul. The  national competitor plays in the guard position.

She played with Beşiktaş Cola Turka, Fenerbahçe, Botaş Spor and Mersin Metropolitan Municipality. Tunçluer won the Turkish Women's Basketball League champion title with Beşiktaş in 2005 and with Fenerbahçe İstanbul in 2007 to 2011.

Tunçluer was member of the national team at the 2005 Mediterranean Games in Almería, Spain, which won the gold medal. She played 170 times for Turkey national women's basketball team.

See also
 Turkish women in sports

External links
Player profile at fenerbahce.org
Player profile at fibaeurope.com

References

1980 births
Living people
People from Ede, Netherlands
Sportspeople from Gelderland
Dutch people of Turkish descent
Dutch expatriate basketball people in Turkey
Turkish women's basketball players
Botaş SK players
Fenerbahçe women's basketball players
Beşiktaş women's basketball players
Mersin Büyükşehir Belediyesi women's basketball players
Guards (basketball)
Basketball players at the 2012 Summer Olympics
Olympic basketball players of Turkey